Naya o La Chapetona (1900) is a novel by the Ecuadorian priest Manuel Belisario Moreno.

Monument in Zamora 

In 2004 the municipality of Zamora, Ecuador constructed, and placed in the center of town, a monument of "Naya o la Chapetona" the protagonist of the novel of the same name. The mayor Eugenio Reyes announced that the design of the monument was created by the sculptor Luis Viracocha of Quito. The monument is approximate 6 meters in height.

References 

Ecuadorian novels